King Kuang of Zhou, personal name Jī Bān, was the twentieth king of the Chinese Zhou dynasty and the eighth of the Eastern Zhou.

King Kuang's father was King Qing of Zhou. Kuang was succeeded by his brother King Ding of Zhou.

Ancestry

See also

Family tree of ancient Chinese emperors

References 

607 BC deaths
Zhou dynasty kings
7th-century BC Chinese monarchs
Year of birth unknown